Pongsri Woranuch (Thai: ผ่องศรี วรนุช) is a Thai singer. She first became a star in the 1950s with the orchestra of Suraphon Sombatjalern, practicing music in the style of luk thung. Soon she became the first singer to be called "queen of luk thung". Woranut melded the style of traditional Thai folk music to music from outside the region, including various genres of East Asian music, Latin American music, and American country music and film music. Alongside Suraphon Sombatjalern, she is considered one of the most important of this genre's practitioners. In 1992, she became the second luk thung artist awarded the title of Thai National Artist.

References

Pongsri Woranuch
Pongsri Woranuch
Living people
1938 births
Pongsri Woranuch
Pongsri Woranuch